Dictyocladium is a genus of hydrozoans belonging to the family Sertulariidae.

The species of this genus are found in Northern America, Southern Africa, Pacific Ocean.

Species:

Dictyocladium amplexum 
Dictyocladium biseriale 
Dictyocladium coactum 
Dictyocladium flabellum 
Dictyocladium fuscum 
Dictyocladium monilifer 
Dictyocladium reticulatum 
Dictyocladium thuja 
Dictyocladium watsonae

References

Sertulariidae
Hydrozoan genera